Heteropsis davisoni, the Palni bushbrown, is a species of satyrine butterfly found in southern India. Some authors consider this as a subspecies of Heteropsis mamerta or Mycalesis malsara or Mycalesis lepcha.

Description

References

Elymniini
Butterflies of Asia
Butterflies described in 1891
Endemic fauna of India
Taxa named by Frederic Moore